Wakefield is a working-class and middle-class section of the northern borough of the Bronx in New York City. It is bounded by the city's border with Westchester County to the north, East 222nd Street to the south, and the Bronx River Parkway to the west.

Wakefield is the northernmost neighborhood in New York City (although the city's northernmost point is actually in Riverdale, at the College of Mount Saint Vincent). The neighborhood is part of Bronx Community District 12 and its ZIP Codes are 10466 and 10470. Wakefield is patrolled by the 47th Precinct of the New York City Police Department.

History 

Wakefield, originally in Westchester County, became part of New York County, and New York City, when the eastern section of The Bronx was incorporated and merged with the western section (previously incorporated in 1873) as a boro of New York City, in 1895. Like the rest of the Bronx, it was once mainly forested and later became farmland. With the expansion of railroad transportation via the arrival of the New York and Harlem Railroad circa 1840, the area experienced moderate development. In 1898, the boroughs of Manhattan and The Bronx were merged with greater New York City as a result of the state legislature's decision to amalgamate New York City with Brooklyn, Queens, and Staten Island. The Bronx later attained independent county status on April 19, 1912, which makes it the 62nd and youngest county in the state.

The current Wakefield station of the Metro-North Railroad's Harlem Line was on the site of a village called Washingtonville, which was incorporated into Wakefield when it became a village on August 8, 1889. Wakefield was named after the Virginia plantation where George Washington was born (now part of George Washington Birthplace National Monument). Neighboring Mount Vernon, in Westchester County, is named for the plantation where Washington lived for most of his adulthood.

Demographics
Formerly, Wakefield was home to large Irish American and Italian-American populations. During the 1980s, these communities were replaced with large Caribbean and Guyanese populations, which now compose 72.3% of the neighborhood's total population. 19.6% of the population is Hispanic. Many residents are or are descended from the Caribbean (mostly Jamaican) and Guyanese immigrants.

The 2010 United States Census reported a population of 67,813 residents in the surrounding area, while the 2000 United States Census reported a total of 68,787 residents.

Police and crime
Wakefield and Eastchester are patrolled by the 47th Precinct of the NYPD, located at 4111 Laconia Avenue. The 47th Precinct ranked 35th safest out of 69 patrol areas for per-capita crime in 2010.

The 47th Precinct has a lower crime rate than in the 1990s, with crimes across all categories having decreased by 60.9% between 1990 and 2022. The precinct reported 16 murders, 45 rapes, 461 robberies, 732 felony assaults, 300 burglaries, 758 grand larcenies, and 461 grand larcenies auto in 2022.

Social problems
Wakefield has seen a rise in gangs and gang-related violence from neighboring Edenwald. The high school drop-out rate is higher than the city average, but lower than central Bronx neighborhoods. Many households in the area are headed by a single mother.

Fire safety
Wakefield is served by the New York City Fire Department (FDNY)'s Engine Co. 63/Ladder Co. 39/Battalion 15, located at 755 East 233rd Street.

Post office and ZIP Codes
Wakefield is located within two ZIP Codes. Most of the neighborhood is located in 10466, but certain areas around East 241st Street and White Plains Road are part of 10470. The United States Postal Service operates the Wakefield Station post office at 4165 White Plains Road.

Education

Schools

There are several public schools scattered throughout the neighborhood including PS 16, PS 21 and PS 103. There are also many private and catholic schools including St. Francis-Assisi, Our Lady of Grace and the prominent all-male Catholic secondary school Mount Saint Michael Academy, which serves 1,100 students from grades 7-12. The all-female St. Barnabas High School is located further west in Woodlawn and serves many students from Wakefield as well.

Library
The New York Public Library (NYPL)'s Wakefield branch is located at 4100 Lowerre Place. The branch opened in 1938 and contains collections in its basement and first floor.

Transportation
The following MTA Regional Bus Operations bus routes serve Wakefield:
 : to Locust Point (via Williamsbridge Road)
 : to Eastchester or Norwood – 205th Street (via Nereid Avenue and Mundy Lane)
 : to Woodlawn or Westchester Square (via Eastchester Road)
 : to Soundview and Clasons Point, Bronx (via White Plains Road)
 : Express bus to Midtown Manhattan
Wakefield is also served by the following Bee-Line Bus System routes to Westchester County, New York:
 BL25: to Yonkers (via Kimball Avenue and Midland Avenue)
 BL26: to Bronxville (via Bronx River Road)
 BL40: to White Plains and Valhalla (via NY Route 22)
 BL41: Limited Stops to White Plains and Valhalla (via NY Route 22)
 BL42: to New Rochelle (via White Plains Road, West 1st Street and Sanford Blvd)
 BL43x: Express to Valhalla (via Sprain Brook Parkway)

The following New York City Subway stations serve Wakefield:
 Wakefield–241st Street
 Nereid Avenue
 233rd Street
 225th Street

The Metro-North Railroad also stops at Wakefield station, served by the Harlem Line.

In popular culture
Several scenes from the 1970 film Love Story starring Ryan O'Neal and Ali MacGraw were filmed on East 233rd Street, East 238th Street (Nereid Avenue), and Barnes Avenue, all located within the neighborhood. The Redeemer Evangelical Lutheran Church located at 4360 Boyd Avenue (corner of Barnes Avenue) is featured in the film.

Many internal and external bar scenes from the second season of the Showtime network's drama series Billions were filmed at the longtime neighborhood bar Cullen's Tavern, located at 4340 White Plains Road.

Scenes for The Sopranos prequel film, The Many Saints of Newark were filmed in Wakefield and neighboring Edenwald in May 2019.

Notable natives and residents
 Lloyd Barnes – Jamaican music producer
 Dick Bertel - American media personality and broadcast executive
 Darcel Clark – current Bronx District Attorney
 Rocco B. Commisso – founder and CEO of Mediacom and notable philanthropist
 Desus Nice – comedian and TV personality
 Joseph Augustine Di Noia, Roman Catholic Archbishop based in the Vatican City.
 Silvio DiSalvatore – independent filmmaker and reality television personality
 Funkmaster Flex – hip hop DJ, rapper and producer
 Ramarley Graham – police-brutality victim.
 Craig muMs Grant - poet and actor (series Oz)
 Rosetta Lenoire, theatrical and television actress; she spent her final years living on East 232nd Street and was a parishioner of St. Frances of Rome Church on East 236th Street.
 Adelina Patti – 19th century opera singer
 Carlotta Patti – 19th century opera singer
 Harry G. Pellegrin – musician and author
 Christian Petroni – notable chef and Food Network personality
 Cristina Santiago – LGBT activist, was one of seven victims killed during the August 2011 Indiana State Fair stage collapse
 AJ Silver (born Angelo Iodice) – American rodeo circuit celebrity
 Anthony Thomopoulos - former network American Broadcasting Company chairman and motion picture producer.
 Mildred Trouillot, attorney and former First Lady of Haiti; resided on Carpenter Avenue in her youth and graduated from St. Barnabas High School
 Jerry Vale - singer, entertainer. He resided with his family on Mundy Lane during his early years.

References

External links

 
 Wakefield local interest group

Former villages in New York City
Neighborhoods in the Bronx
Wakefield, Bronx